Trabada is one of seven parishes (administrative divisions) in the municipality of Grandas de Salime, within the province and autonomous community of Asturias, in northern Spain.

The population is 84 (INE 2006).

Villages and hamlets
Folgosa
La Coba (A Coba)
La Fornaza (A Fornaza)
Llandepereira (Llandepireira)
Mazo de Riodecabalos
Molino de la Coba (Molín Da Coba)
Monteserín Grande (Monteseirín Grande)
Monteserín Pequeño (Monteseirín Pequeno)
Trabada
Valías de la Coba (Valías Da Coba)

References

Parishes in Grandas de Salime